Jeremiah Norbert is a Saint Lucian politician, Deputy Speaker of The Lower House and former Police Officer. Norbert won his seat in the 2021 general election. The Micoud North seat was deemed a United Workers Party stronghold but Norbert is now the representative for Micoud North in the House of Assembly elected for the Saint Lucia Labour Party.

Post career 
Norbert served in the Royal Saint Lucia Police Force for 10 Years. Norbert was the Best Recruit in his Graduating Class of 2011.

Education 
Norbert is pursuing studies at the University of the West Indies Open Campus in a Bachelor's program in Political Science.

References

External links 
 Jeremiah Norbert's profile at the Saint Lucia Labour Party's website

Living people
Saint Lucia Labour Party politicians
21st-century Saint Lucian politicians
Members of the House of Assembly of Saint Lucia
Year of birth missing (living people)